Gerd Müller (1945–2021) was a German footballer.

Gerd Müller may also refer to:

Gerd A. Müller (1932–1991), German industrial designer
Gerd B. Müller (born 1953), Austrian theoretical biologist
Gerd Müller (politician) (born 1955), German politician

See also 
Gerard Muller (1861–1929), Dutch Impressionist painter
Gerhard Müller (disambiguation)